The Madrasa of Mahmud Gawan is an ancient madrasa or Islamic college in Bidar, Karnataka, India. It was built in the 1460s and is an example of the regional style of Indo-Islamic architecture under the Bahmani Sultanate.  This heritage structure is placed under the list of monuments of national importance. Founded by the prime-minister of the Bahamani empire in the late 15th century, it bears testimony to the scholarly genius of Mahmud Gawan, who first came to Delhi as a Persian trader (in exile) from Gilan in Iran and moved to Bidar in 1453.

Mahmud reportedly built the madrasa with his own money and it functioned like a residential University which was built and maintained on the lines of Madrasa of Khurasan. The imposing and spacious building of the institution is considered as an architectural gem and an important landmark of Bidar.

The building is one of those put by UNESCO on its "tentative list" to become a World Heritage Site in 2014, under the name Monuments and Forts of the Deccan Sultanate (despite there being a number of different sultanates).

Location
It is Situated on the Deccan Plateau 2330 feet above the sea level, Bidar has long been a place of Cultural and Historical Importance. The monument is located between the Chowbara (Clock Tower) and the fort from where it is a few hundred meters away. Remains of the monument stand strong amongst the chaos of urban settlement around it. Its principal east facade, now partly ruined, faces the city's main street leading to the citadel.

Description
The Madrasa (religious seminary) has been a striking building though long in a ruinous condition. It occupied an area of 205 feet by 180, and was entered by a large gateway on the east in front of which it had two lofty towers about a hundred feet high. The rooms surround an open area 100 feet square, in the middle of each of three sides of which was a large apartment or hall 26 feet wide by about 52 in length, rising to the full height of building, which is of three stories. Each of these hall has a dome on the outer end over the oriel that projects beyond the line of the walls. The walls of the Madrasa measure exactly 242 feet from east to west and 220 feet from north to south.

The foundations and the lower courses, at least, of the building are all jointed with thin sheets of lead. The tower (minar) has been faced with enameled tiles of different colours in zig zag lines round the lower half of it. Portions of the walls, especially in the front have also been covered with the same materials, and a broad frieze along the top of the front wall has been inscribed with sentences from Q'uran in coloured letters on a ground of green and gold. Of this a part is still to be seen on the right side of the front.

The building has a high basement but to make the approach convenient, two terraces have been built in front of it. The main entrance has vanished, but its floor has been exposed during excavations. Beyond the entrance there was a portico, square in plant at the base, measuring 15 ft. 4 inches each way. The minaret at the northern and of the façade and the wall adjoining it towards the south are comparatively the best preserved portions of the Madrasa although their tile decoration and trellis work have survived only in fragments. The minaret has on octagonal base with round shape at the point. The lower has three storey, the first and second having balconies which project from the main body of the tower in a curvilinear form but have no brackets to support them.

Due to the shiny nature of coloured tiles on the minar, local people call the monument as ″Kaanchina Khamba″ (Kannada; Kaanch=Glass, Khamba=Tower)

History

In the reign of Muhammad Shah Bahamani II (1463-1482), Khwaja Mahmud Geelani (better known as Mahmud Gawan), an old noble who bore the title of Maliku't-Tujar built the Madrasa of which the remains still exist. In the time of Firishta, nearly a century and a half later, it was still in perfect preservation and with the great mosque and other buildings by the same founder, in what was called Gawan-ki Chowk (present day Gawan Chowk) were then still applied to the purpose for which they were originally designed.

In 1635, during the wars of Aurangzeb, Bidar was ravaged by Khan Dauran. In the end of 1656, it was invested by Aurangzeb himself. The historians of this time describes ″he entered the city and proceeding to a mosque which had been built 200 years before, in the reign of Bahamani Sultans, he caused the Kutba to be read in the name of his father Emperor Shah Jahan.

After this capture, the madrasa was principally appropriated as barrack for a body of cavalry, while a room (or rooms) near the left Minar were used to store gunpowder which exploded in an accident. It blew up fully of one-fourth of the edifice, destroying the tower and entrance.

It is also recorded in history that the structure suffered significant damage following a lightning struck in 1696.

Significance
The madrasa however, built to reaffirm Shiaism as the state religion, is clearly modeled on contemporary central Asian buildings. The entire campus gives the grand impression which Islamic architecture awakes in many minds. Intelligent planning and construction have gone into building the madrasa. The surface treatment is composed of color produced by glazed tiles of different hues. Traces of exquisite colorful tiles are still visible on the walls of the building. The floral decor, arabesque design and decorative inscriptions with arches dominating everywhere make it a fine specimen of Islamic architecture. This was all possible because Mahmud Gawan was familiar with renowned colleges at Samarkhand and Khorasan. The building contains lecture halls, a laboratory, a mosque, students’ hostel, dining room, quarters for teaching faculty. This religious seminary which also taught science and maths was run by a carefully chosen faculty which comprised Islamic scholars, scientists, philosophers and Arabic experts. It is recorded that free boarding, lodging and education to over 500 students from the world over was provided at any given time. The founder had established a library of 3000 volumes in this university before his death; what became of it is not known.

Preservation
The Archaeological Survey of India (ASI) took up the programme to preserve and protect ancient monuments in Bidar district in 2005. It included marking boundaries around these structures, building aesthetically designed compound walls, providing lighting and laying gardens around some monuments.

Bidar has found its place in the World Monument Watch List, 2014 which gives some hope for improvements in this City of Whispering Monuments.

Concerns 
Today goats graze among the majestic ruins and the windows with exquisite jali-work look out like haunted eyes.
According to an estimate, there are nearly 100 historic monuments in and around Bidar. Mahmud Gawan Madarasa is among the monuments in Bidar that require round-the-clock watch. The Archaeology office is understaffed. Plans of developing park around the madarsa has not yet realised. The open space behind the monument is used as cricket ground by locals, with the balls often hitting the monument.

Trivia
On 8 March 2015, A huge old tree in front of the monument was uprooted due to hours of wind, heavy rain and thunderstorms. The tree was believed to be more than a century old.

Gallery

References

Education in Bidar
Tourist attractions in Bidar
Mosques in Karnataka
Madrasas in India
Buildings and structures in Bidar district
Tourist attractions in Bidar district
Bahmani architecture